The 2004–05 BCAFL was the 20th full season of the British Collegiate American Football League, organised by the British Students American Football Association.

Changes from last season
Divisional Changes
The Northern Conference expanded from three Divisions to four (gaining a Central Division)
The Northern Conference, Borders Division became the Scottish Division

Team Changes
University of Greenwich joined the Southern Conference, as the Mariners
Lancaster Bombers moved within the Northern Conference from Borders to Western Division
Napier University joined the Northern Conference, as the Edinburgh Timberwolves
Newcastle Raiders moved within the Northern Conference from Borders to Eastern Division
University of Paisley rejoined the Northern Conference after seven seasons away, as the Pyros
Sheffield Hallam Warriors moved within the Northern Conference from Eastern to Western Division
Sheffield Sabres moved within the Northern Conference from Eastern to Western Division
Sunderland Kings re-joined after one season back
Surrey Stingers moved within the Southern Conference from Eastern to Southern Division
UKC Falcons moved within the Southern Conference from Eastern to Southern Division
This increased the number of teams in BCAFL to 36.

Regular season

Northern Conference, Scottish Division

Northern Conference, Eastern Division

Northern Conference, Western Division

Northern Conference, Central Division

Southern Conference, Central Division

Southern Conference, Eastern Division

Southern Conference, Western Division

Southern Conference, Southern Division

Playoffs

Note – the table does not indicate who played home or away in each fixture.

References

External links
 Official BUAFL Website
 Official BAFA Website

2003
2005 in British sport
2004 in British sport
2005 in American football
2004 in American football